Robert Tracy (1655–1735) was an English judge.

Life
Born at Toddington in Gloucestershire, he was fifth son of Robert Tracy, 2nd Viscount Tracy of Rathcoole, he was the eldest son of his second wife, Dorothy, daughter of Thomas Cocks of Castleditch, Herefordshire. Robert's paternal grandmother, Anne, was daughter of Sir Thomas Shirley of Wiston, Sussex. He matriculated from Oriel College, Oxford, on 29 October 1672, and entered the Middle Temple the following year.

Tracy was called to the bar in 1680. In 1692 he stood for election to Parliament at Tewkesbury in a by-election to replace Lord Capell, but was defeated by Sir Francis Winnington. In July 1699 he was appointed a judge of the King's Bench in Ireland, but the following year he was transferred to England on 14 November as a baron of the Exchequer. In Trinity term 1702 he was removed to the Court of Common Pleas. He was appointed a commissioner of the Great Seal while the lord-chancellor's office was vacant from 24 September to 19 October 1710, and from 15 April to 12 May 1718. He was one of the judges who gave an opinion on Henry Sacheverell's trial and he took part in trying the Jacobites at Carlisle in 1716.

On 26 October 1726, Tracy retired from the bench with a pension of £1,500. He died at his seat at Coscomb in Gloucestershire on 11 September 1735.

Family
By his wife Anne, daughter of William Dowdeswell of Pull Court, Worcestershire, he left three sons—Robert, Richard, and William—and two daughters—Anne and Dorothy. Dorothy married John Pratt, fourth son of Sir John Pratt, chief justice of the King's Bench.

References

Attribution

1655 births
1735 deaths
English barristers
18th-century English judges
Barons of the Exchequer
Justices of the Common Pleas
Younger sons of viscounts